The 1937 Florida Gators football team represented the University of Florida during the 1937 college football season. The season was the second for Josh Cody as the head coach of the Florida Gators football team.  The highlight of the season was the Gators' only 1930s win over the Georgia (6–0) in Jacksonville, Florida, but the season was mostly remembered for its disappointments—three one-point losses to Temple (7–6), Mississippi State (14–13), and Clemson (10–9). Cody's 1937 Florida Gators finished 4–7 overall and 3–4 in the Southeastern Conference (SEC), placing eighth of thirteen SEC teams in the conference standings.

Schedule

Game summaries

Temple
Mayberry starred in a close loss to coach Pop Warner's Temple Owls, keeping the 10,000 spectators "in an uproar for nearly three periods."

Georgia
The 1937 team defeated the Georgia Bulldogs in the two teams' annual rivalry game for the first time in eight years.

Postseason
Tiger Mayberry ranked second in the country with 818 rushing yards; only Byron White exceeded Mayberry's rushing total that year.

Mayberry also intercepted six passes when the Gators' opponents only threw 57 balls, and was a first-team All-SEC selection by the conference coaches and sportswriters on behalf of the Associated Press.

References

Florida
Florida Gators football seasons
Florida Gators football